Yurdhai may refer to:
 Yurdhai-ye Abdol Yusefi
 Yurdhai-ye Miraki